The following is a list of members of the Canadian Parliament who died while they were serving their terms from 1950 to 1999.

Senate

House of Commons

See also
 List of members of the Canadian Parliament who died in office (1867–1899)
 List of members of the Canadian Parliament who died in office (2000-)

References

External Links

Canadian Parliament
Parliament of Canada
Died in office